Moviment Graffitti is a left-wing radical environmentalist non governmental organisation and pressure group in Malta.

Moviment Graffitti promotes an amalgamation of leftist sociopolitical ideas, mainly human rights, equality, environmentalism and anti-fascism. It was founded in 1994.

Goals 
Moviment Graffitti stands "against the oppression and exploitation of people, the environment and animals", and for "social justice, equality and sustainability", "with a vision of freedom and radical democracy". This entails supporting and lobbying for fairer workers’ rights such as an increase in the minimum wage and working towards a new and equal economic system in which exploitation has no place. This includes standing against the destruction of the environment, illegal developments and the privatisation of public spaces.

Moviment Graffitti stands for the well-being of all humanity and thus, for the right of migration for all and against a world with man-made borders. An important part of standing for a more just world is actively working to eradicate racism and xenophobia by organising actions and information campaigns as well as pushing for migrants’ rights. One campaign that the movement feels strongly about is showing international solidarity with the plight of Palestinians by raising awareness of the cruel and constant injustice and discrimination they face every day at the hands of the Israeli state.

Current prominent members of the movement include Andre Callus (since the early 2000s) as well as LGBTI and pro-Palestine activist Alex Caruana.

Tactics 
Moviment Graffitti's most visible activities are direct actions to draw public attention to specific issues, including protest demonstrations, banner-drops, and sit-ins.

While remaining autonomous from economic interests or political parties, Moviment Graffitti has regularly built coalitions and networks with like-minded stakeholders to work as a common front on issues such as racism, destruction of natural landscape and animal rights. It has regularly supported workers' struggles and voiced its stance in favour of workers' rights.

Moviment Graffitti frequently holds awareness-raising campaigns where it distributes information and engages in discussions in public spaces and other venues such as universities, schools, and youth centres via film-nights, talks, and discussions.

The movement has no formal organisation and decisions are taken during regular assembly meeting where anyone who shares the organisation's vision and principles can attend and contribute. Their activities are self-funded through membership-payment and fund-raising events held throughout the year.

History 
Founded in 1994, the movement has shown resilience despite the constant turnover of activists throughout 25 years of activity, with a constant central message defined by James Debono as "playfully left wing, anti-racist, socially liberal and largely focused on land use issues", providing its members with a counterculture-based sense of identity.

In the 1990s, members used to communicate over pamphlets sold over University of Malta campus - as later captured in Guze Stagno’s novel Inbid ta’ Kuljum and in Karl Schembri's Il-Manifest tal-Killer. Ideological references shifted between marxism and anarchism, green politics and new left. It also used to be close to the activists of Żminijietna (Voice of the Left), and for a brief period around 2000 it used the premises of the defunct Maltese Communist Party in Strait Street, Valletta. While before 1996 it was openly supportive of the Malta Labour Party, it later switched to closeness to Alternattiva Demokratika, Malta's green party, for whom also worked as recruitment pool. Yet, it also cooperated with other organisations such as Studenti Demokristjani Maltin during the 1996 stipend protests.

Its main campaigns have been on land use issues, consistently protesting overdevelopment under any government, and building coalitions with different allies.

In terms of political positions, Moviment Graffitti opposed the 1994 Maltese concordat on marriage, called for the decriminalisation of abortion, endorsed Alfred Sant's Labour at the 1996 elections, and in 2000 supported Malta's EU accession bid.

Campaigns
Against Hilton development with Front Kontra l-Hilton (1994–1997) with Friends of the Earth Malta and YMCA activist Jean Paul Mifsud;
Against the creation of Junior College to replace Sixth Form (1995)
School stipend protests (1996)
Anti McDonald's Day (1995–2000)
Verdala golf course with Front Kontra l-Golf Kors (2000–2004)
Took part in anti-ACTA Protest (2012)
Solidarity with Palestinians march (2012)
Solidarity with Palestinians march (2014)
Gathering in favor of YES vote in the 2015 Greek bailout referendum (2015)
Nakba Commemoration Gathering in Valletta (2015)
Żonqor AUM development with Front Ħarsien ODZ (2015)
Commemoration of killing of four boys in Gaza beach  in 2014 Israel-Gaza war (July 2015)
Manoel Island with Kamp Emerġenza Ambjent (2016–2018), with Brikkuni frontman Mario Vella
Paceville Masterplan with Kamp Emerġenza Ambjent (2016–2017)
Increase in Minimum Wage  (2017–2018)
Rent Control Proposal (2018)
Iż-Żejjed Kollu Żejjed Protest (2019)
Black Lives Matter (2020)

Persons linked with Moviment Graffitti 
 Mary Grace Vella, sociologist
 James Debono, journalist
 Michael Briguglio, later chairman of Alternattiva Demokratika, PN candidate at the 2019 European elections, sociologist
 Alex Sciberras, lawyer, then Labour mayor of Msida
 Mark Vella and Guze Stagno, novelists
 Aleks Farrugia, former editor of It-Torca
 Jurgen Balzan, then Alternattiva Demokratika and journalist
 Silvan Agius, Policy Director of ILGA Europe 2000–2003, AD MEP candidate in 2014; director of human rights and integration for Helena Dalli's ministry
 Chris Mizzi, Commonwealth youth worker
 Mark Camilleri, then founder of Ir-Realtà and Front Against Censorship, former head of the National Book Council (2013-2021)
 David Pisani, activist for Zminijietna
 Monique Agius, chairperson of the first Front Harsien ODZ, then PD candidate at the 2018 elections and activist of Civil Society Network
Andre Callus, advocate for migrant rights and environmental activist

References

Bibliography 
 Michael Briguglio, THE ZONQOR CONFLICT IN MALTA, ANUARI DEL CONFLICTE SOCIAL 2015
 Michael Briguglio (2015). ‘Ten Years of Malta’s EU Membership - The Impact on Maltese Environmental NGOs.’ Reflections of a Decade of EU Membership: Expectations, Achievements, Disappointments and the Future, Occasional Papers, No. 7, Institute for European Studies (Malta)

External links
Moviment Graffitti Facebook page

Political advocacy groups in Malta